The 2015 season is Chonburi's 10th season in the Thai Premier League of Chonburi Football Club.

Pre-season and friendlies

Thai Premier League
Toyota Thai Premier League

League table

AFC Champions League

Thai FA Cup
Chang FA Cup

Thai League Cup
Toyota League Cup

Squad statistics

Transfers
First Thai footballer's market is opening on 6 November 2014 to 28 January 2015.

Second Thai footballer's market is opening on 3 June 2015 to 30 June 2015.

In

Out

Loan in

Loan out

Ch
Chonburi F.C. seasons